2011 in Malaysia is the 54th anniversary of Malaysia's independence.

Incumbents

Federal level
Yang di-Pertuan Agong:
Sultan Mizan Zainal Abidin of Terengganu (until 12 December)
Sultan Abdul Halim Muadzam Shah of Kedah (from 13 December), 
Raja Permaisuri Agong:
Sultanah Nur Zahirah of Terengganu (until 12 December)
Sultanah Haminah Hamidun of Kedah (from 13 December)
Deputy Yang di-Pertuan Agong:
 Sultan Abdul Halim Muadzam Shah of Kedah (until 12 December)
 Sultan Muhammad V of Kelantan (from 13 December)
Prime Minister: Dato' Seri Najib Tun Abdul Razak
Deputy Prime Minister: Tan Sri Muhyiddin Yassin
Chief Justice: Zaki Azmi then Arifin Zakaria

State level
  : 
Sultan of Johor: Sultan Ibrahim Ismail
Menteri Besar of Johor: Datuk Seri Abdul Ghani Othman
  : 
Sultan of Kedah: (Council of Regency of Kedah) (from 13 December)Tunku Annuar (Chairman)Tunku Sallehuddin (Members I) Tunku Abdul Hamid Thani (Members II) Tunku Puteri Intan Safinaz (Members III) 
Menteri Besar of Kedah: Datuk Seri Azizan Abdul Razak
  : 
Sultan of Kelantan: Sultan Muhammad V (Deputy Yang di-Pertuan Agong) (from 13 December)
Menteri Besar of Kelantan: Nik Aziz Nik Mat
  : 
Raja of Perlis: Tuanku Syed Sirajuddin
Menteri Besar of Perlis: Datuk Seri Dr Md Isa Sabu
  : 
Sultan of Perak: Sultan Azlan Shah
Menteri Besar of Perak: Datuk Seri Dr Zambry Abdul Kadir
  : 
Sultan of Pahang: Sultan Ahmad Shah
Menteri Besar of Pahang: Datuk Seri Adnan Yaakob
  : 
Sultan of Selangor: Sultan Sharafuddin Idris Shah
Menteri Besar of Selangor: Tan Sri Abdul Khalid Ibrahim
  : 
Sultan of Terengganu: Tengku Muhammad Ismail (Regent) (until 12 December)
Menteri Besar of Terengganu: Datuk Seri Ahmad Said
  : 
Yang di-Pertuan Besar of Negeri Sembilan: Tuanku Muhriz
Menteri Besar of Negeri Sembilan: Datuk Seri Mohamad Hasan
  : 
Yang di-Pertua Negeri (Governor) of Penang: Tun Abdul Rahman Abbas
Chief Minister of Penang: Lim Guan Eng
  : 
Yang di-Pertua Negeri (Governor) of Malacca: Tun Mohd Khalil Yaakob
Chief Minister of Malacca: Datuk Seri Mohd Ali Rustam
  : 
Yang di-Pertua Negeri (Governor) of Sarawak: Tun Abang Muhammad Salahuddin
Chief Minister of Sarawak: Pehin Sri Haji Abdul Taib bin Mahmud
  : 
Yang di-Pertua Negeri (Governor) of Sabah: Datuk Juhar Mahiruddin (from 1 January)
Chief Minister of Sabah: Datuk Seri Musa Aman

Events

January

1 January – The Bandar Tasik Selatan Integrated Transport Terminal (Terminal Bersepadu Selatan) is opened for public.
11 January – An Air Asia passenger plane carrying 130 passengers and crew skidded off the runway at Kuching International Airport, Sarawak.
1–17 January – Several parts of East Coast Peninsula Malaysia were hit by flash floods.
16 January – Sarawak's Chief Minister, Abdul Taib Mahmud marries Syrian lady, Ragad Waleed Alkurdi.
17 January – The opening of Batang Tiga Police Station Gallery in Tanjung Kling, Malacca.
21 January – Malaysian naval commandos rescued 23 crew members of the MT Bunga Laurel oil tanker which was hijacked by Somali pirates in the Gulf of Aden.
22 January – Three young victims are murdered by a group of unknown motorists in Masjid Tanah, Malacca.
28 January–3 February – Several parts of Southern Peninsula Malaysia were hit by flash floods.
28 January – The new anthem and lyrics for Federal Territory is launched.
29 January – The government announces that there will be no toll hike for Kuala Lumpur–Karak Expressway and East Coast Expressway (Phase 1) for every five years.
30 January – Tenang by-election, 2011. Barisan Nasional (BN) candidate, Mohd Azahar wins this by-elections with a majority of 3,707 votes beating PAS candidate Normala Sudirman.

February
2 February – The government decides to bring Malaysian students by air or sea out of Egypt due to the worsening anti-government uprising in that country.
2 February – Three Royal Malaysian Air Force (RMAF)'s C-130 Hercules leaves for Egypt in the Ops Piramid (Operation Pyramid) mission to bring home Malaysian students from the trouble country.
7 February – Ops Piramid mission successful. About 7,000 Malaysians have been evacuated from Egypt since it was started on 2 February.
14 February – The Royal Commission of Inquiry on Teoh Beng Hock's Death begins hearing at Kuala Lumpur Courts Complex, Jalan Duta.
19 February – Protests in Bahrain, Libya, Algeria and Yemen. Malaysian citizens who are registered with the Malaysian embassies in Algiers, Algeria, Manama, Bahrain, Tripoli, Libya and Sanaa, Yemen are all reported safe and none of them are involved in the riots.
22 February – Prime Minister Najib Razak visits Turkey for the first time and meets its prime minister Recep Tayyip Erdogan.
27 February – More than 109 protesters of the HINDRAF (Hindu Rights Action Force) members were arrested by police for allegedly taking part in an illegal demonstration to protest the novel Interlok in Kuala Lumpur.

March
2 March – Malaysian Prime Minister Najib Razak visits Australia for the first time and meets with Australian Prime Minister Julia Gillard.
6 March – Merlimau and Kerdau by-elections. Barisan Nasional (BN) win in both by-elections. In Merlimau, Malacca. BN candidate, Roslan Ahmad wins with a majority of 3,643 votes beating PAS candidate Yuhaizad Abdullah. In Kerdau, Pahang. BN candidate, Syed Ibrahim Syed Ahmad wins with a majority of 2,724 votes beating PAS candidate, Hassanuddin Salim.
11–12 March – Following the Great East Japan earthquake and tsunami with the subsequent of Fukushima nuclear fallout, Malaysian citizens who are registered with the Malaysian embassy in Tokyo are all reported safe. Malaysia sends a 15-members of search and rescue team (SMART), with medical officers and 6 tracker dogs, to tsunami-hit Japan.
13 March – World's no.1 badminton player, Lee Chong Wei wins All England titles for the second time beating China's Lin Dan in the finals at Birmingham, England.
13 March – A Malaysian animated series, BoBoiBoy, was premiered on TV3.
20 March – An 11-year-old boy, Muhammad Naquiddin was electrocuted to death when he touched a lamppost at a playground at Batu Tiga, Selangor.
21 March – Five silat masters were killed when the van there were travelling in skidded and rammed into a tree at Pendang, Kedah.
21 March – Tengku Ampuan Bariah of Terengganu (1979–1998), the mother of the Yang di-Pertuan Agong, Tuanku Mizan Zainal Abidin died at Seri Kota Medical Centre in Klang, Selangor. Her body was flown back to Terengganu and was laid to rest at the Royal Mausoleum near Al-Muktafi Billah Shah Mosque, Kuala Terengganu. Terengganu declares a 40 days of mourning period.
28 March – Several parts of East Coast Peninsula Malaysia including Terengganu was hit by flash floods.

April
2 April – The Malaysian Anti-Corruption Commission (MACC) arrested 62 Royal Malaysian Customs officers of various ranks and posts under the 3b operation for alleged involvement in corruption, money laundering and other offences.
6 April – A Royal Malaysian Customs Selangor state assistant director, Ahmad Sarbani Mohamed, 56 was found dead on the first floor of the Federal Territory Malaysian Anti-Corruption Commission (MACC) office in Jalan Cochrane, Kuala Lumpur.
6 April – The remains of national hero Mohammed Abdul Lalil @ Jalil, who was killed in a plane crash at Gua Musang, Kelantan during the Malayan Emergency on 25 August 1950 was brought back to Muar, Johor and was buried in Bukit Treh Muslim Cemetery.
11 April – A pilot was killed in a helicopter crash in Sibu, Sarawak.
16 April – Reopening of the Puduraya bus terminal in Kuala Lumpur.
16 April – Sarawak state election, 2011. Barisan Nasional (BN) retains its two-thirds majority in the 71-seat state assembly. Abdul Taib Mahmud sworn in as Chief Minister of Sarawak.
20 April – Canadian teen singer, Justin Bieber performs his concert in Malaysia for the first time at Stadium Merdeka, Kuala Lumpur.
27 April – Chinese Premier, Wen Jiabao visits Malaysia for the second time and attend the Malaysia-China Economic, Trade and Investment Forum in Kuala Lumpur.
27 April – Ten Malaysians are arrested at the Auckland International Airport in New Zealand for trying to smuggle in methamphetamine worth NZ$10mil (RM24mil) in their shoes.
29 April – Datuk Shazryl Eskay Abdullah performed the sumpah laknat (oath-cum-curse) oath at Amru Al-As Mosque in Bandar Baru Sentul, Kuala Lumpur by swearing in God's name that the Opposition Leader, Datuk Seri Anwar Ibrahim is the man featured in the sex video on February 21, 2011 that was recently shown to journalists.

May
5 May – Lesotho prime minister, Pakalitha Mosisili visits Malaysia and meets the prime minister, Najib Tun Razak in Putrajaya.
10 May – Three people were killed and five others were injured in the 11-vehicle pile-up at the t-junctions in Bahau, Negeri Sembilan.
17 May – The toll collections of the East–West Link Expressway from Salak Interchange to Taman Connaught Interchange is abolished.
21 May – 16 people mostly 15 children and a caretaker of an orphanage were killed in a landslide caused by heavy rains at the Children's Hidayah Madrasah Al-Taqwa orphanage in FELCRA Semungkis, Hulu Langat, Selangor.
27 May – The biggest National Youth Day celebrations, Hari Belia Negara is held in Putrajaya.

June
4 June – Malaysian football coach, K. Rajagopal and the late goalkeeper, R. Arumugam aka "Spiderman" were awarded Panglima Jasa Negara (PJN) which carried title "Datuk" by Yang di-Pertuan Agong
5 June – Najib Tun Razak visits Kazakhstan for the first time and meets its president Nursultan Nazarbayev in the capital Astana.
10 June – The Sungai Johor Bridge on the Senai–Desaru Expressway, Johor, the longest river bridge in Malaysia is opened for public for the first time.
22 June – The Kedai Rakyat 1Malaysia (KR1M) convenience store is unveiled by the Prime Minister, Najib Tun Razak.
23 June – A 124-page report by the Royal Commission of Inquiry on Teoh Beng Hock's Death is presented to the Yang di-Pertuan Agong, Tuanku Mizan Zainal Abidin at Istana Terengganu, Kuala Lumpur.
24 June – AirAsia places the largest single order in commercial aviation history, purchasing 200 Airbus A320neo jetliners.
25 June – A family of three, including a baby boy, died in an early morning fire at Heng Guan Garden, Matang, Kuching, Sarawak.
26 June – Police arrest 31 members of the Parti Sosialis Malaysia (PSM) including Sungai Siput Member of Parliament Dr Michael Jeyakumar Devaraj in Penang in relation to the July 9 Bersih 2.0 rally.
28 June – The Perdana Lake Gardens (Taman Tasik Perdana) is renamed Perdana Botanical Gardens (Taman Botanik Perdana).

July

1 July – The Malaysia's Keretapi Tanah Melayu Berhad (KTMB) train service between Woodlands, Bukit Timah and the Tanjong Pagar railway station, Singapore ceased all operations. The KTMB's Tanjong Pagar railway station was relocated to the new terminus at the Woodlands Train Checkpoint (WTCP).
2 July – Home Minister, Datuk Seri Hishamuddin Tun Hussein declares that the Coalition for Clean and Fair Elections (Bersih 2.0) is an unlawful organisation.
4 July – The 1Malaysia People Housing Scheme (PR1MA) is launched by the Prime Minister, Najib Tun Razak.
4 July – The Yang di-Pertuan Agong, Tuanku Mizan Zainal Abidin issues a special statement on Bersih 2.0 rally saying that street demonstrations will bring more bad than good to the country.
5 July – The July 9 Bersih 2.0 street rally in Kuala Lumpur has been called off. The rally will be held in stadium.
7 July – The kindergarten hostage crisis took place in Sungai Abong, Muar, Johor. About 30 kindergarten children and four teachers of the Serikids Kindergarten were saved and the hammer-wielding man who held 30 children and four teachers hostage at a kindergarten was injured in his head and later he died at the Sultanah Fatimah Specialist Hospital.
8 July – About 91 individuals involved in planning the three separate Bersih 2.0 rallies on 9 July have been barred from the Kuala Lumpur business district on that day. Among those barred from entering the business district are Bersih 2.0 steering committee chairman Ambiga Sreenevasan, UMNO Youth chief Khairy Jamaluddin and Perkasa chief Datuk Ibrahim Ali. Others include DAP adviser Lim Kit Siang, PKR leader Datuk Seri Anwar Ibrahim, PKR vice-president and Batu MP Tian Chua, UMNO Youth secretary Datuk Megat Firdouz Megat Junid and Putera 1Malaysia Club president Datuk Abdul Azeez Abdul Rahim.
8 July – The Klang Valley's MY Rapid Transit (MRT) project is officially launched by the Prime Minister, Najib Tun Razak. Construction of the Sungai Buloh–Kajang line, part of the Klang Vally's MRT system has now begun.
9 July – The illegal Bersih 2.0 rally take place in Kuala Lumpur. Police fired teargas and water cannon to the protestors at all major hot spots in the city such as Central Market, Menara Maybank, Puduraya and KLCC. Police arrest more than 1,600 people including committee chairman Ambiga Sreenevasan, UMNO Youth chief Khairy Jamaluddin and Perkasa chief Datuk Ibrahim Ali. Others include DAP adviser Lim Kit Siang, PKR leader Datuk Seri Anwar Ibrahim, PKR vice-president and Batu MP Tian Chua, UMNO Youth secretary Datuk Megat Firdouz Megat Junid and Putera 1Malaysia Club president Datuk Abdul Azeez Abdul Rahim. Later that night, all 1,600 people were released.
11 July – Najib Tun Razak visits Turkmenistan for the first time and meets its president Gurbanguly Berdimuhamedov in the capital Ashgabat.
14 July – Najib Tun Razak meets British Prime Minister, David Cameron at No. 10 Downing Street, London.
18 July – Najib Tun Razak meets Pope Benedict XVI in Vatican City for the first time. The diplomatic relations between Malaysia and Holy See were established.
26 July – The remains of 21 Iban trackers and Sarawak Rangers who fell during Malayan Emergency were brought back from Kuala Lumpur to Sarawak and reburied in Heroes Cemetery in Kuching.
31 July – Sungai Siput Member of Parliament Dr Michael Jeyakumar Devaraj and 5 others detained under the Emergency Ordinance just before the Bersih 2.0 rally on July 9 have been released.

August
15 August – Perak Veterinary Services Department deputy director Dr Rohani Kassim was found death in Tambun near Ipoh.
6 August – Opening of the Bakun Hydroelectric Dam, the largest dam in Malaysia and Southeast Asia.
7 August – Seven people, including a family of three, died in a landslide in Kampung Sungai Ruil near Brinchang in Cameron Highlands, Pahang.
18 August – Businessman and entrepreneur, Tony Fernandes completed his takeover of Premier League club Queens Park Rangers after buying out Formula One boss Bernie Ecclestone and former Renault F1 team principal Flavio Briatore. Fernandes, who runs budget airline Air Asia and the Team Lotus Formula One team, bought a 66 percent stake in the London club through his company, the Tune Group.
21 August – PAS deputy president, Mohamad Sabu or Mat Sabu delivered a controversial statement by saying that it was Muhammad Indera or Mat Indera and the 200 Malayan Communist Party (PKM) terrorist soldiers during the 1950 Bukit Kepong Incident who deserved to be claimed as "national heroes" and not the police officers who fought to their deaths defending the Bukit Kepong police station, claiming that all police officers during the massacre as the "British officers" and the PKM soldiers are "true national heroes" as they "fought the British".
24 August – The 1Malaysia People's Welfare Programme (KAR1SMA) is unveiled by the Prime Minister, Najib Tun Razak.
27 August – The Puduraya bus terminal was renamed as Pudu Sentral and it was officially opened by the Prime Minister, Najib Tun Razak.
31 August – Singapore government handed back its water treatment plants in Mount Pulai and Skudai and pump houses at Pontian and Tebrau to Johor state government ending the 1961 Water Agreement between Malaysia and Singapore.

September
2 September – Bernama TV cameraman Noramfaizul Mohd Nor 39, was killed, while a TV3 cameraman Aji Saregar Mazlan was injured after the Malaysian media team's four wheel drive vehicle was hit by stray bullet in an attack by rebel forces in Mogadishu, Somalia during the humanitarian mission in the country led by Putera 1Malaysia Club (KP1M). Noramfaizul was given as a true nation's hero by the government.
3 September – Google started to collaborate with Tourism Malaysia to record Malaysian locations to be featured on its Google Map Street View.
8 September – Effective 15 September, prepaid mobile users need to pay a six per cent (6%) service tax on mobile prepaid services.
12 September – The six per cent (6%) service tax on mobile prepaid services is on hold.
13 September – Construction of the new Pandaruan Bridge of the Malaysia–Brunei border has now begun.
15 September – Najib Tun Razak announced the abolishment of the Internal Security Act 1960 (ISA) and the three Emergency Declarations (Banishment Act (1959) and Emergency Ordinance) and will replaced by two new laws. The new laws will be enacted to protect the peace, harmony and security of the country.
17 September – Four Malaysians were killed in the bomb attacks in Sungai Golok, Thailand, a town near the border with Malaysia.
20 September – PAS deputy president, Mohamad Sabu or Mat Sabu was charged in court in relation to his speech about Muhammad Indera or Mat Indera during the 1950 Bukit Kepong Incident.
24 September – An Iban hero during Insurgency, Kanang anak Langkau was conferred the Panglima Gemilang Bintang Kenyalang (P.G.B.K.) (English: Commander of the Order of the Hornbill Sarawak), with the title of 'Datuk' from the Yang di-Pertua Negeri (Governor) of Sarawak, Tun Abang Muhammad Salahuddin.
28 September – Two security guards and a couple suffered minor injuries when a gas leak caused a massive explosion at the Empire Shopping Gallery in Subang Jaya, Selangor.

October

4 October – The Dewan Rakyat session move to the multipurpose hall near the Parliament House as a temporary assembly.
4 October – A tower crane fell onto three residential houses in Georgetown, Penang
5 October – All 125 people detained under the Restricted Residence Act has now freed as now part of move to repeal the act.
7 October – The Budget 2012 is held at the multipurpose hall near the Parliament House.
8 October – Bernama TV cameraman Noramfaizul Mohd Nor 39, who was killed in an attack in Mogadishu, Somalia received the posthumous award of Bintang Gagah Perkasa (B.G.P) from the Yang di-Pertua Negeri (Governor) of Melaka, Tun Mohd Khalil Yaakob.
21 October – A man suffered light injuries when the front of his car was hit by a landslide at Km 13.9 of the Genting Sempah–Genting Highlands Highway near Genting Highlands, Pahang.
22 October – About 5,000 people gathered for the "Himpun Sejuta Umat" (Himpun) rally at the Shah Alam Stadium, Shah Alam, Selangor.
23 October – Italian MotoGP rider, Marco Simoncelli was killed in a horrific crash on the second lap during 2011 Malaysian Motorcycle Grand Prix at Sepang International Circuit, Selangor. His death is the first tragedy in the history of the Malaysian Motorcycle Grand Prix and the first to have happened in a race at this circuit.
29 October – A Malaysian tanker MV Nautica Johor Baru with 11 Malaysian and eight Indonesian crew members on board was rescued from hijackers on morning after they were attacked by a group of 10 foreign men armed with a pistol and parang.
31 October – Nine people, including a pregnant woman, were injured when a Sabah State Railway passenger train crashed into an oil tanker at a level crossing in Jalan Kota Kinabalu–Petagas near the Kota Kinabalu International Airport (KKIA), Kota Kinabalu, Sabah.

November

1 November – The Klang Bus Station or Klang Bus Stand is closed to make way for the new Pasar Seni MRT station. The station is part of the construction of the new Sungai Buloh–Kajang MRT line.
3 November – The 2011 Seksualiti Merdeka event was banned by the federal government.
3 November – Malaysia has officially become a member of the Antarctic Treaty Pact. It is the first ASEAN country and the 49th nation to do so. 
11 November – Four people were killed in the bus-trailer crash at North–South Expressway near Behrang, Perak.
15 November – The Istana Negara at Bukit Petaling is officially closed and moved to the new building at Jalan Duta.
20 November – Malaysian football team wins gold medal after beating Indonesia (2-2) 4-3 in the penalty shootout at the 2011 SEA Games football men's final in Indonesia.
29 November – The Peaceful Assembly Bill of 2011 is passed by the Malaysian Parliament.

December
11 December – The Johor Premium Outlets a main shopping centre in Iskandar Malaysia, Johor is opened.
13 December – Sultan Abdul Halim Muadzam Shah of Kedah is elected as the country's 14th Yang di-Pertuan Agong for the second time and Sultan Muhammad V of Kelantan is elected as the Deputy Yang di-Pertuan Agong.
21 December – The new series of Malaysian Ringgit banknotes and coins were introduced.

National Day and Malaysia Day
1Malaysia; Transformasi Berjaya, Rakyat Sejahtera (1Malaysia; Transformation Successful, People Prosperous)

National Day parade
Not held

Malaysia Day celebrations
Dataran Merdeka, Kuala Lumpur

Sports
22 January–1 February – Le Tour de Langkawi 2011
8–13 March – Jelajah Malaysia 2011
14–17 April – 2011 Maybank Malaysian Open
13 July – Arsenal FC Asian Tour – Malaysia vs Arsenal (0-4)
16 July – Liverpool FC Asian Tour – Malaysia vs Liverpool (3-6)
21 July – Chelsea FC Asian Tour – Malaysia vs Chelsea (0-1)
26 September–2 October – 2011 Proton Malaysian Open

Deaths
1 January – Faizal Yusof – Malaysian actor. (born 1978)
6 February – Abdul Ajib Ahmad – former Johor Menteri Besar (Chief Minister) (1982–1986)
21 March – Tengku Ampuan Bariah of Terengganu (1979–1998) – mother of the Yang di-Pertuan Agong, Tuanku Mizan Zainal Abidin
17 July – Lo' Lo' Mohd Ghazali – Titiwangsa PAS Member of Parliament
18 July – James Wong Kim Min – Sarawak's first Deputy Chief Minister
1 September – Hassan Ahmad – Yayasan Karyawan chairman and Dewan Bahasa dan Pustaka (DBP) chief director
2 September – Noramfaizul Mohd Nor – Bernama TV cameraman
10 September – David Choong – Badminton legend
23 October – Marco Simoncelli – Italian Motogp rider.
23 December – Abdul Hamid Othman – Former Minister in the Prime Minister's Department.

See also
 2011
 2010 in Malaysia | 2012 in Malaysia
 History of Malaysia
 List of Malaysian films of 2011

 
Years of the 21st century in Malaysia
2010s in Malaysia
Malaysia
Malaysia